W. W. Norton & Company is an American publishing company based in New York City. Established in 1923, it has been owned wholly by its employees since the early 1960s. The company is known for its Norton Anthologies (particularly The Norton Anthology of English Literature) and its texts in the Norton Critical Editions series, both of which are frequently assigned in university literature courses.

History and overview
The roots of the company date to 1923, when William Warder Norton founded the firm with his wife Mary Dows Herter Norton, and became its first president. In the 1960s, Mary Norton offered most of her stock to its leading editors and managers. Storer D. Lunt took over in 1945 after Norton's death, and was succeeded by George Brockway (1957–1976), Donald S. Lamm (1976–1994), W. Drake McFeely (1994–2017), and Julia A. Reidhead (2017–present). Reidhead was vice president and publishing director of Norton's College division and a former editor of the Norton Anthologies. 

Imprints of W. W. Norton include Norton Professional Books (professional works in mental health, well-being, architecture and design, and education), Countryman Press (lifestyle and instructional books, including healthy-living, cookbooks, and hiking guides), Liveright (20th century classics and new works), and Norton Young Readers (books for preschoolers to young adults).

Series

Norton Anthologies
Norton Anthologies collect canonical works from various literatures; perhaps the best known anthology in the series is the Norton Anthology of English Literature, which, is in its 10th edition. Norton Anthologies offer general headnotes on each author, a general introduction to each period of literature, and annotations for every anthologized text.

Norton Critical Editions
Like Oxford World's Classics and Penguin Classics, Norton Critical Editions provide reprints of classic literature and in some cases, classic non-fiction works. However, unlike most critical editions, all Norton Critical Editions are sourcebooks that provide a selection of contextual documents and critical essays along with an edited text. Annotations to the text are provided as footnotes, rather than as endnotes.

The States and the Nation
The States and the Nation series was published in celebration of the United States Bicentennial. It comprised 51 volumes, one for each state and the District of Columbia. The series was administered by the American Association for State and Local History via a grant from the National Endowment for the Humanities.

Notable authors 

 Dean Acheson
 A. R. Ammons
 Diane Ackerman
 J. G. Ballard
 Andrea Barrett
 Vincent Bugliosi
 Pete Buttigieg
 Kate Brown
 Jared Diamond
 Rita Dove
 John Dower
 Andre Dubus III
 Stephen Dunn
 Erik Erikson
 Eric Foner
 Nadine Gordimer
 Annette Gordon-Reed
 Stephen Greenblatt
 Pekka Hämäläinen
 Seamus Heaney
 Sam Harris
 Carl Jung
 Sebastian Junger
 Nicole Krauss
 Eric Kandel
 Paul Krugman
 Maxine Kumin
 Stanley Kunitz
 Joseph Lash
 Michael Lewis
 William McFeely
 Larry McMurtry
 John Matteson
 John Mearsheimer
 Edmund Morgan
 Edmund Phelps
 Chuck Palahniuk
 Gustave Reese
 Adrienne Rich
 Mary Roach
 Russell Shorto 
 Jonathan Spence
 Joseph Stiglitz
 William Taubman
 Alan Taylor 
 Neil deGrasse Tyson
 Harold Varmus
 Isser Woloch
 Sean Wilentz
 Edward O. Wilson
 Fareed Zakaria
 Hal Varian

See also 
 Oxford World's Classics
 Verso Book's Radical Thinkers
 Albatross Publishing House
 Boni & Liveright

References

External links
 
 W.W. Norton & Company records, 1923-1967 at the Rare Book & Manuscript Library

American companies established in 1923
1923 establishments in New York (state)
Book publishing companies based in New York City
Employee-owned companies of the United States
Publishing companies established in 1923